is a Japanese comedian (pin entertainer), comic chat artist, actor and lyricist. His wife is former Morning Musume member and tarento Ai Takahashi.

Abe is represented with Yoshimoto Kogyo in Tokyo (Tokyo Yoshimoto, a subsidiary of Yoshimoto Creative Agency).

He is the R-1 Grand Prix Champion of 2010.

Programme appearances

Films

Television dramas

Stage

Songwriting
Nander Max

Videography

In-store broadcasts

References

External links

 
 (blog by himself) 

Japanese comedians
Japanese lyricists
People from Yokohama
1975 births
Living people